The South Korea men's national tennis team represents South Korea in Davis Cup tennis competition and are governed by the Korea Tennis Association.

In 2020, South Korea will compete in World Group I.

Current team (March 2020)

2020 Davis Cup Qualifying Round against Italy:
 Chung Hong
 Lee Duck-hee
 Nam Ji Sung
 Chung Yunseong
 Song Min-kyu

History
South Korea competed in its first Davis Cup in 1960.

Squad members
Active players listed in bold; active player rankings (in parentheses) as of December 5, 2011; 2011's record is included

Results

See also
Davis Cup
South Korea Fed Cup team

External links

Korea, South
Davis Cup
Davis Cup